A nuclear bag fiber is a type of intrafusal muscle fiber that lies in the center of a muscle spindle. Each has many nuclei concentrated in bags and they cause excitation of the primary sensory fibers.

There are two kinds of bag fibers based upon contraction speed and motor innervation.
BAG2 fibers are the largest. They have no striations in middle region and swell to enclose nuclei, hence their name.
BAG1 fibers, smaller than BAG2.

Both bag types extend beyond the spindle capsule.

These sense dynamic length of the muscle. They are sensitive to length and velocity.

See also
 Nuclear chain fiber

References

External links
 http://www.unmc.edu/Physiology/Mann/mann11.html 

Nervous system
Muscular system